Bacchae are an American punk rock band from Washington, D.C. The band takes their name from the ancient Greek tragedy, The Bacchae. The band has been compared to The B-52's and The Cure.

Formed in 2016, the band self-released their debut album, Down the Drain in 2017. The Philadelphia label Get Better Records released Bacchae's follow-up self-titled EP in 2018, as well as their album Pleasure Vision in 2020.

Discography
Pleasure Vision (2020)
Bacchae (2018)
Down the Drain (2017)

References

External links
Bacchae on Bandcamp

Musical quartets
Punk rock groups from Washington, D.C.
Indie rock musical groups from Washington, D.C.
Musical groups from Washington, D.C.
2016 establishments in Washington, D.C.